Parliamentary elections were held in Greece on 5 March 1950. The People's Party emerged as the largest party in Parliament, winning 62 of the 250 seats.

Results

References

Parliamentary elections in Greece
Legislative election
1950s in Greek politics
Greece
Greece
Election and referendum articles with incomplete results
Legl